Lymington and Pennington is an administrative area formed in 1974 in the New Forest district of Hampshire, England. It  covers the historical settlements of Pennington village and Lymington Town, as well as smaller hamlets, and newer residential areas.

Lymington and Pennington Town Council 

A parish council (which has chosen to call itself a Town Council so that it may have a Mayor rather than a Council Chairman) is elected by residents of the Lymington and Pennington administrative area.

Local Government Elections 
The whole Lymington and Pennington administrative area can elect one County Councillor to Hampshire County Council.

For New Forest District Council elections (as well as local parish elections), Lymington is split into Lymington Town and Buckland such that there are three wards in total:

History 
The histories of Lymington Town and Pennington village are documented on their separate pages.

Civil parishes in Hampshire
New Forest District